Brixton railway station is a commuter railway station in Brixton, South London, UK. Trains are operated by Southeastern. The typical service is one train every 15 minutes in both directions.

Access is from Atlantic Road via staircases. It is also a busy junction, with the Catford Loop via  and  leaving the Chatham Main Line immediately west of the station, though there are currently only platforms on the Chatham Main Line. The South London line crosses above the east end of the platforms, without stopping nearby.

History

Brixton was opened as Brixton and South Stockwell in 1862 by the London, Chatham and Dover Railway (LC&DR) to serve the affluent Victorian suburbs of South London. Services ran from Moorgate to London Victoria via Snow Hill (Holborn Viaduct), Camberwell New Road and Brixton and South Stockwell to Grosvenor Road, following the opening of the link northeastwards to  via  in 1864. The station was also connected to the LC&DR's branch to  via  soon afterwards, with this section (via ) becoming part of the modern-day Catford Loop Line.

The station is currently served only by trains on the main line towards Herne Hill. The Denmark Hill line platforms were closed in April 1916 as a wartime economy measure and have been demolished except for a short section of the up platform. However, the line itself remains in regular and frequent use by both freight and passenger services.

Services 
All services at Brixton are operated by Southeastern using  and  EMUs.

The typical off-peak service in trains per hour is:
 2 tph to 
 2 tph to  via 

The service is increased to 4 tph in each direction during the peak hours.

Future Proposals

The London Overground network passes above the station without stopping. This segment of the South London Line became part of the network as the second phrase of the East London line extension project. Completed in December 2012, the extension connected the South London Line to the East and West London Lines, from Surrey Quays to Clapham Junction.

The line also passes through Loughborough Junction. Adding both stations to the route was excluded from the plan due to the prohibitive cost of building on the high viaducts at each location. The proposals drew criticism for not including new interchange stations at these locations. Until 1976 trains stopped at nearby . It has been proposed that this disused station could be reopened instead as the site is close to both Brixton and Loughborough Junction.

Artworks 
A number of colourful murals have been painted on the outside of the station. Inside the station, three bronze sculptures stand on the platforms. This work, Platforms Piece by Kevin Atherton, was erected in 1986 and the statues are life casts of three people - two black, one white - who regularly travelled from Brixton. The statues, believed to be the first sculptures of black British people in a public place in the UK, were given Grade II listed status in November 2016.

Gallery

Connections

London Buses routes 2, 3, 35, 37 (at Lambeth Town Hall); 45, 59, 109, 118, 133, 159, 196, 250, 322, 333, 345 (at Brixton Police Station), 355, 415, 432, 689, 690, P4, P5 and night routes N2, N3, N35, N109 and N133 serve the station.

See also 
Murder of Deborah Linsley – unsolved 1988 murder of a woman that occurred on a train travelling between Brixton and London Victoria

References

External links 

Railway stations in the London Borough of Lambeth
Former London, Chatham and Dover Railway stations
Railway stations in Great Britain opened in 1862
Railway stations served by Southeastern
Railway station
1862 establishments in England
Grade II listed buildings in the London Borough of Lambeth